Top of the Hill is an American political drama television series aired by CBS from September 21 to November 30, 1989 as part of its 1989 fall lineup.

Synopsis
Top of the Hill starred William Katt as U.S. Representative Thomas Bell, Jr., son of a long-time Congressman who had been forced to resign his seat due to health issues but who remained on "The Hill" to help his son in an advisory role, which sometimes led to conflicts.  Bell, Jr., had, despite his father's position, never followed politics closely or ardently prior to being chosen as his father's successor, which was sometimes a liability but also gave him the ability to look at issues, even long-running ones, through a fresh set of eyes.  Young Bell also had a hard time fitting into the political party structure as he desired to do what his conscience told him would be the best thing for the country and the voters in his district.  In the less than three months that the program ran, the Congressman became involved in some fairly contentious issues, including adoptee rights, labor union corruption, pollution, and military procurement.

Top of the Hill failed to find a large enough audience to last more than a season; the show had to compete with the Top 10 hit Cheers and the Top 20 hit Dear John, both on NBC in the same time slot.

Cast
 William Katt as Thomas Bell, Jr.
 Jordan Baker as Susan Pengilly
 Tony Edwards as Link Winslow
 Dick O'Neill as Thomas "Pat" Bell, Sr.
 Robbie Weaver as Mickey Stewart

Episodes

References
Brooks, Tim and Marsh, Earle, The Complete Directory to Prime Time Network and Cable TV Shows

External links
 

1989 American television series debuts
1989 American television series endings
1980s American drama television series
Television series by Stephen J. Cannell Productions
Television series by 20th Century Fox Television
CBS original programming
American political drama television series
 Television shows set in Washington, D.C.